Solange was a Christian saint who died in 880.

Solange may also refer to:

People with the given name
 Solange (psychic) (1952–2021), Italian TV personality, psychic and commentator 
 Solange Ancona (born 1943), French composer
 Solange Ashby, American Egyptologist, Nubiologist and archaeologist
 Solange Azagury-Partridge (born 1961), London-based jewellery designer
 Solange Berry (born 1932), Belgian singer
 Solange Bertrand (1913–2011), French abstract painter, sculptor, and engraver
 Solange Chaput-Rolland (1919–2001), Canadian journalist, author, lecturer, politician, and senator
 Solange Charest (born 1950), Quebec (Canada) politician
 Solange d'Herbez de la Tour (born 1924), French architect 
 Solange Fernex (1934–2006), French activist and politician 
 Solange Gemayel (born 1949), Lebanese political figure, wife of President Bashir Gemayel
 Solange Ghernaouti (born 1958), Lebanese-Swiss professor and cybersecurity expert
 Solange Gomez (born 1988), Argentine actress and model
 Solange Knowles (born 1986), American R&B/soul singer
 Solange Lwashiga Furaha, human and women's rights activist from the Democratic Republic of the Congo
 Solange Macamo, Mozambican archaeologist
 Solange Magalhães (born 1939), Brazilian painter
 Solange Magnano (1971–2009), Argentine beauty queen
 Solange Michel (1912–2010), French classical mezzo-soprano singer
 Solange Pierre (1963–2011), known as Sonia Pierre, human rights advocate in the Dominican Republic
 Solange Rodriguez (born 1976), Ecuadorian professor and short-fiction writer
 Solange Sanfourche (1922–2013), alias Marie-Claude, French resistance fighter
 Solange Tagliavini (born 1985), Argentine team handball player
 Solange Troisier (1919–2008), French physician
 Solange Wilvert (born 1989), Brazilian model
 Solange Yijika, Cameroonian actress and film producer

Places
 Sainte-Solange, commune in the Cher department in central France

Others
 Solange, a novel by Willy Kyrklund
 Diana von Solange, opera by the German prince Ernst II of Saxe-Coburg-Gotha
 Solange Dimitrios, character in the 2006 film Casino Royale
 What Have You Done to Solange?, a 1972 Italian–West German giallo film directed by Massimo Dallamano
 The nicknames of two court cases concerning the conflict of law between the German national legal system and European Union law:
 Solange I: Case 11/70 Internationale Handelsgesellschaft mbH v Einfuhr- und Vorratsstelle für Getreide und Futtermittel [1970].
 Solange II: Re Wünsche Handelsgesellschaft (22 October 1986) BVerfGE.

French feminine given names